"Someday (I'm Coming Back)" is a song recorded by British singer, songwriter and actress Lisa Stansfield for the 1992 American romantic thriller film The Bodyguard, starring Kevin Costner and Whitney Houston. It was released as a single in the United Kingdom on 7 December 1992 and in other European countries in early 1993. "Someday (I'm Coming Back)" was written by Stansfield, Ian Devaney and Andy Morris, and produced by Devaney and Morris.  The single was released from the soundtrack album. An accompanying music video, directed by Marcus Nispel, was also released. The single reached number ten in Portugal and the United Kingdom. "Someday (I'm Coming Back)" was remixed by Absolute and the "Classic" remixes were created by Frankie Knuckles and David Morales.

In 2003, the song was included on Stansfield's compilation, Biography: The Greatest Hits. In 2014, "Someday (I'm Coming Back)" and remixes of the song were included on the deluxe 2CD + DVD re-release of So Natural (also on The Collection 1989–2003).

Chart performance
"Someday (I'm Coming Back)" was a sizeable hit on the charts in Europe, entering the top 10 in both Portugal (10) and the UK. In the latter, the single also peaked at number ten on the UK Singles Chart on 27 December 1992. It debuted at number 19 in its first week on the chart, before climbing to number 11 and then peaking at number 10. It also peaked at number 14 on the UK Dance Singles Chart. Additionally, the single was a top 20 hit in Ireland (16), a top 30 hit in Iceland (29) and the Netherlands (30), while entering the top 40 in Belgium (39), as well as on the Eurochart Hot 100, where it reached number 34 in January 1993. Outside Europe, "Someday (I'm Coming Back)" charted in Australia, peaking at number 116.

Critical reception
Amy Linden from Entertainment Weekly complimented the song as a "real beauty". Howard Cohen from The Miami Herald wrote that here, Stansfield "glides through a catchy, soulful number". Alan Jones from Music Week felt it's "more uptempo than we've had from her of late, a cheerful uplifting and very commercial cut which draws a polished and soulful vocal performance from her, punctuated by a wailing sax." Stephen Holden from The New York Times called it a "superior piece of pop-disco fluff that Lisa Stansfield infuses with a passionate intensity." Parry Gettelman from Orlando Sentinel viewed it as "a disposable dance number from the ordinarily enticing Lisa Stansfield." James Hamilton from the RM Dance Update complimented it as "prettily cooed". Arion Berger from Rolling Stones felt that here, Stansfield "holds up a sturdy vocal wall of Jericho". John Mackie from The Vancouver Sun stated that she "adds a little style and a soulful vocal to the gliding dance number".

Retrospective response
In an 2022 retrospective review, Matthew Hocter from Albumism wrote, "One of the album’s best tracks that never received its dues, Lisa Stansfield’s “Someday (I’m Coming Back)” was the second single released from the album. Credited as disco/pop, it is much more soulful than this qualifier, with Stansfield dynamically delivering her unique brand of blue-eyed soul with each and every note she masters throughout this beautifully polished and executed song. The saxophone lamenting in and out of the track only adds to its intensity and passion. It’s pure disco soul at its finest." Bob Waliszewski of Plugged In declared it as "a positive tune about supportive romance".

Track listings
 European 12-inch single
 "Someday (I'm Coming Back)" – 5:34
 "Live Together"/"Young Hearts Run Free" (live) – 7:51
 "Someday (I'm Coming Back)" (Absolute remix) – 6:24
 "Tenderly" (live) – 5:00

 European CD single
 "Someday (I'm Coming Back)" – 5:34
 "Tenderly" (live) – 5:00

 European CD maxi single
 "Someday (I'm Coming Back)" – 5:34
 "Tenderly" (live) – 5:00
 "Live Together/Young Hearts Run Free" (live) – 7:51

Charts

References

Lisa Stansfield songs
1992 singles
1992 songs
Arista Records singles
Disco songs
Music videos directed by Marcus Nispel
Songs written by Andy Morris (musician)
Songs written by Ian Devaney
Songs written by Lisa Stansfield
Songs written for films